Panbeh Zaban (also Romanized as Panbeh Zabān; also known as Panbeh Zanān) is a village in Zarrineh Rud Rural District, Bizineh Rud District, Khodabandeh County, Zanjan Province, Iran. At the 2006 census, its population was 674, in 137 families.

References 

Populated places in Khodabandeh County